Paidiscura subpallens is a species of comb-footed spider in the family Theridiidae. It is found in China, Korea, and Japan.

References

Theridiidae
Spiders described in 1906